In calculus, the general Leibniz rule, named after Gottfried Wilhelm Leibniz, generalizes the product rule (which is also known as "Leibniz's rule").

where  is the binomial coefficient and  denotes the jth derivative of f (and in particular ).

The rule can be proved by using the product rule and mathematical induction.

Second derivative
If, for example, the rule gives an expression for the second derivative of a product of two functions:

More than two factors
The formula can be generalized to the product of m differentiable functions f1,...,fm.

are the multinomial coefficients. This is akin to the multinomial formula from algebra.

Proof

The proof of the general Leibniz rule proceeds by induction.  Let  and  be -times differentiable functions.  The base case when  claims that:

which is the usual product rule and is known to be true.  Next, assume that the statement holds for a fixed  that is, that

Then,

Multivariable calculus
With the multi-index notation for partial derivatives of functions of several variables, the Leibniz rule states more generally:

This formula can be used to derive a formula that computes the symbol of the composition of differential operators. In fact, let P and Q be differential operators (with coefficients that are differentiable sufficiently many times) and  Since R is also a differential operator, the symbol of R is given by:

A direct computation now gives:

This formula is usually known as the Leibniz formula. It is used to define the composition in the space of symbols, thereby inducing the ring structure.

See also

References

Articles containing proofs
Differentiation rules
Gottfried Wilhelm Leibniz
Mathematical identities
Theorems in analysis
Theorems in calculus